Fondazione Cassa di Risparmio di Genova e Imperia is a charity organization based in Genoa, Liguria region. The foundation was the largest shareholders of Banca Carige.

History

The bank failed in the capital inspection by the Single Supervisory Mechanism in 2014. During the year the number of ordinary shares was increased from 2,174,664,623 to 10,167,553,157. The new shares made the bank recapitalized €779,288,853.4. The foundation only partly subscribed the capital increases that were allowed to them, with the rest was excised by borrowing money from Mediobanca (additional 7.037%). After the deal the foundation owned 12.142% ordinary shares of the bank (1,234,561,214), comparing to 46.52% in 2013 (1,011,689,946).

At the start of year the foundation reacquired some shares, which was increased to 1,270,944,145 number of shares (the total ordinary shares of the bank also increased to 10,393,917,760 number of shares, due to all share deal to privatize CR Carrara and Savona). On 8 May 2015 the foundation sold a further 10.271% ordinary shares (1,067,593,081 number of shares) of the bank to Malacalza Investimenti (a company chaired by ). After the deal the foundation only kept 203,351,064 ordinary shares, or 1.956% of the total number of ordinary shares.

As at 31 December 2015 the foundation had a net assets of €69,960,698.

Controversies
In 2014, La Repubblica Genoa edition reported that, the foundation had purchased a helicopter which was rarely used. Before the helicopter was donated to the Liguria Region, it was rarely used by the firemen of Genoa, which the foundation lent it to them.

References

External links
  

1991 establishments in Italy
Organizations established in 1991
Banking foundations based in Italy
Organisations based in Genoa